Michael John McGoldrick (18 June 1965 – 8 July 1996) was a taxi driver murdered by the Loyalist Volunteer Force during The Troubles in Northern Ireland.

Personal life 
McGoldrick was born to Northern Irish parents in Glasgow, Scotland. He had graduated two days before the murder with a degree in English & Politics from Queen's University Belfast, and hoped to become a teacher. He had a daughter Emma with his wife, Sadie, and a son on the way. McGoldrick worked as a taxi driver in Lurgan, Northern Ireland part-time to finance his studies.

Murder 
In July 1996, the Drumcree standoff increased tensions between the loyalist and nationalist populations of Northern Ireland, and particularly the Craigavon area. The Troubles saw more than 3,600 people killed in a 30-year period, the majority of whom were civilians murdered by paramilitaries. On 7 July, members of the loyalist Orange Order were blocked by police from marching down the Garvaghy Road in Portadown. The annual march had been contentious, with loyalists passing through a majority nationalist community holding banners and playing drums and pipes. It was claimed to be sectarian and supremacist, and had been accompanied by violence in previous years.

As a response, the Mid-Ulster brigade of the Ulster Volunteer Force led by Billy Wright sought to unilaterally break the ceasefire the group was operating under, and murder civilians from nationalist areas. One plan was to kidnap three priests from the local parochial house and shoot them unless the march went ahead. Instead members of the brigade, as a "birthday present" to leader Wright, preyed on the province's taxi services which, because of previous murders during The Troubles, had grown unofficially segregated serving mainly the same communities as the drivers. A taxi was ordered in the late evening from the Minicabs depot in Lurgan under the name "Lavery" going from the local cinema to Aghagallon and McGoldrick responded to the call. When the radio controller got no response later in the early morning, he assumed McGoldrick had clocked off for the night. Early the next morning he was found slumped over the wheel of his taxi. He had been shot five times in the head.

Aftermath 
The murder drew significant attention from regional and national media, as it had the distinct appearance of paramilitary type execution during a ceasefire. The Ulster Volunteer Force stood down the brigade a month later, with leader Billy Wright forming the alternative Loyalist Volunteer Force. The splinter organisation engaged in a feud with the Ulster Volunteer Force, its last murders being of Ulster Volunteer Force members and other loyalists. Wright was killed less than 18 months after McGoldrick's death by the Irish National Liberation Army in Long Kesh prison, and his group disbanded in August 1998.

At present, Clifford George McKeown is serving a life sentence for the murder. After the guilty verdict was delivered, the victim's father, Michael McGoldrick Snr, said he felt no bitterness towards his son's killer. "The hurt in our country has to stop," he said. McKeown later confessed to journalist Nick Martin-Clark that two youths assisted in the murder. They ordered the taxi, and one of them asked McGoldrick to stop at the roadside to let him urinate. McKeown, who had allegedly followed with his lights switched off, slipped close to the back of the taxi and shot McGoldrick. The murder weapon was found in 2006 in the possession of William James Fulton, who is currently serving a life sentence for murder and orchestrating terrorism.

References

1965 births
1996 deaths
Alumni of Queen's University Belfast
People from Glasgow
People killed during The Troubles
People killed by the Loyalist Volunteer Force